Southern Gal is the debut album by American singer-songwriter Terry Ellis. It was released by EastWest Records on November 14, 1995. Recorded and released during the time her band En Vogue were on a two-year hiatus, the album includes the R&B Top 40 hit singles, "Where Ever You Are" and "What Did I Do to You?".

Critical reception

Senior editor Stephen Thomas Erlewine from Allmusic rated the album two out of five stars and found that while Southern Gal "is a smooth, commercial-oriented, hip-hop-informed, contemporary R&B album with pop leanings [and] Ellis' voice is in fine form [...] the album is far from compelling. Even with all the production detail and Ellis'strong performance, it sinks from its lack of high quality songs."

Singles
"Where Ever You Are" was the lead single from the album. It was released on 17 October 1995. The song is Ellis's best selling song to date. It peaked at No.10 in the US R&B Top 40 and peaked at No.52 on the US Hot 100.
"What Did I Do To You?" was the second and final single released from the album. The single was less successful than her previous single. It did however manage to spend 10 weeks on the US R&B Chart, peaking at No.41.

Track listing

Charts

References

1995 debut albums